The State Social Protection Fund (SSPF) of Azerbaijan Republic is a governmental agency within the Cabinet of Azerbaijan in charge of regulating activities in the sector of social insurance and provision of pensions to citizens of Azerbaijan Republic. The agency is headed by Salim Muslumov.

History
Throughout the Soviet rule, the social insurance and pensions to citizens in Azerbaijan were provided by the state. The Soviet system of pensions was based on no contribution principle with employed citizens not directly contributing to any funds, and the state issuing pensions directly from the state budget or state organizations.
In 1990, the Soviet Social Insurance Fund was founded and all enterprises, establishments, organizations, cooperatives, state farms, collective farms and other organizations in the country had to make contributions to this fund. In 1991, by the decree of the Cabinet of Ministers of Azerbaijan SSR, Social Insurance Fund of Azerbaijan SSR was established.

After restoration of independence of Azerbaijan in the second half of 1991, the Azerbaijani branch of the Soviet Pension Fund was transformed into the Pension Fund of Azerbaijan by the Presidential Decree dated December 16, 1991. On June 1, 1992 the National Assembly of Azerbaijan passed a law "On the normative allocations for the Social Insurance and Employment Fund", according to which the social insurance contributions would make 40% of the gross payroll. The Pension Fund was to receive 85% of that amount, while the remaining 15% went to the Social Insurance Fund.
In order to improve and modernize the social security system in the country, on September 30, 1992 President Abulfaz Elchibey issued a decree abolishing the Pension Fund and the Social Insurance Fund, and establishing the State Social Protection Fund in their place. Laws on social insurance and pension reforms in 1997 and 2001 further improved the social security system putting it in line with international standards. On August 4, 2003 another Presidential Decree "On measures for improving the state pension system in Azerbaijan Republic", the functions of the Ministry of Labor and Social Protection of Population of Azerbaijan Republic on providing, financing and control over payments of pensions and additional benefits were passed to the State Social Protection Fund. Due to reforms related to the single insurance–pension system in the country through 2006, the servicemen of the Azerbaijan Armed Forces and persons with special ranks became covered by the mandatory social insurance.

Structure
The fund is headed by Chairman and a Deputy who are appointed by the president of Azerbaijan. 
13 divisions are included in the central office of SSPF:
  
 Pension policy, insurance and strategic research Division
 Finance Division
 Division of Labor 
 Law Division
 Internal Audit Division
 Division for Organization of Individual Accounting 
 Division of Information Technology
 Division for Employment and Training
 Budget Execution Division
 Division for work with retirement documents and appeals
 Economics Division
 International Relations Division
 General Secretariat Division

It has a board of seven directors, which include the chairman, two deputies, the chairman of Nakhchivan Autonomous Republic of Azerbaijan, head of the central office of the fund, head of finance and budget department and the director of the department of the fund for work with the military personnel and persons with special ranks.

Duties of SSPF 

Main functions of the agency are working out proposals on state policies in the field of social insurance and labor pensions; preparation of draft budget of the fund and ensure control over the approved budget; ensuring collection of mandatory state social insurance contributions from all entities and individuals engaged in work activity; enforcing control over implementation of legislative requirements in the process of mandatory social insurance; issuing pensions from the fund's budget; issuing benefits for temporary disability, pregnancy and child delivery, childcare limited to periods stipulated in legislation; issuing full or partial payments for spa treatments of the insured; issuing funeral grants, etc.

According to the fund management, its revenue grew by 8.7% in the first half of 2010. The number of individual personal accounts of the insured is 1,732,215. In 2011, 97.2% (AZM 1.916 bn) out of its total expenditures in 2011 will include payments to the population.

Pension payment system 

SSPF carried out a project to introduce new pension and benefits payment system in 2004-2006. The main advantage of the system was to get pensions by plastic cards via ATMs. As a result of implementation of the project people in all cities and regions of Azerbaijan, even in remote areas, have been provided with plastic cards, and got opportunity to get their pensions and benefits via relevant ATMs.

Approximately 860 thousand persons get their pensions and benefits via ATMs. This forms 80% of the total number of the pensioners.

Electron services of SSPF 
 Online registration of the insurers
 Online registration of family peasant farm
 Online registration of a person who has a land plot suitable for agriculture
 Online registration of the insured
 Acceptance of applications and documents on granting the certificate to the insurer in order to create an account in the bank or other credit organization
 Providing compulsory state social insurance reports
 Providing information on insured persons on mandatory state social insurance contributions
 Submission of a list of employees with preferential employment under labor conditions
 Issuance of a certificate of obligatory state social insurance premium to the insurer
 Acceptance of application for changing or duplicating state social insurance certificate
 Submission of a salary report on temporary disability benefits
 Presentation of pregnancy and maternity benefit report
 Presenting an account statement on the benefits of the child's birth
 Submission of a child-care account scheduling account until the child is three years old
 Providing insured with relevant information 
 Pension calculator
 Reception of applications and documents for the change of retirement and retirement age
 Providing pensioner with relevant information 
 Online payment of compulsory state social insurance funds
 Acceptance of applications and documents related to the payment of benefits for the funeral

See also
Cabinet of Azerbaijan
Economy of Azerbaijan

References

Government agencies of Azerbaijan
Government agencies established in 1992
1992 establishments in Azerbaijan